R. P. M. is a 1970 American drama film directed by Stanley Kramer, starring Anthony Quinn and Ann-Margret. As the film's poster notes, the title is an initialism for "revolutions per minute", which at the time was a common term for the variable speed of a record player's turntable.

Plot
Set against the political turmoil of the 1960s, radical student activists occupy a university's administration building with a list of 12 demands. Unable to resolve the situation, President Tyler resigns, so the Board of Trustees considers a student-made shortlist of recommended professors to take over the job of university president. The board finalizes the choice of Professor F.W.J. "Paco" Perez, despite his radical beliefs, given his close past relationship with students.

After midnight, Perez, along with his sociology graduate student girlfriend Rhoda, is awakened by a phone call by Dean George Cooper, requesting a meeting. Perez is appointed "acting president" of the college campus. Later that morning, Perez arrives to the campus on a motorcycle. Attempting to negotiate with the activists, Perez reads their demands, which include 20 inner-city scholarships, a college reinvestment program, no military research on campus, and an African American on the all-white Board of Trustees. Perez disagrees with three of the 12 demands, including the students' right to hire and fire the faculty.

Perez tells the activists he will deliver on the first nine demands. A brief conflict between the leader, Roositer, and Steve Dempsey, leads to the eighth demand changed to the hiring of a black admissions officer. Perez nominates Dempsey for the position, which the young black activist accepts. Perez serves as mediator between the faculty and the unwavering student body over the unresolved three demands, while being berated at home by Rhoda for his hypocrisy.

Perez notifies the faculty of an audio-recorded message that Roositer will destroy the school's computer hardware if the demands are not met. With no options left, Perez sends in a squadron of police officers led by Police Chief Henry J. Thatcher. Thatcher orders the activists to evacuate the facility in three minutes, but they refuse to comply. The officers invade the building, releasing tear gas, and violently arrest several students. At the police station, Perez sees that Rhoda also has been arrested.

Perez meets with the faculty in the administration building, now back under their control. He signs a bail grantee, defending the outcome of the rebellion. Upon leaving the building, Perez walks through the crowd and is loudly booed by the activists.

Production
The movie was filmed on location at the main campus of the University of the Pacific (UOP) in Stockton, California. The student "extras" were actual members of the student body of the university at that time.

It was the first film Ann-Margret made in the USA for a number of years.

Cast

Anthony Quinn as Prof. F.W.J. "Paco" Perez
Ann-Margret as Rhoda
Gary Lockwood as Rossiter
Paul Winfield as Steve Dempsey
Graham Jarvis as Police Chief Thatcher
Alan Hewitt as Hewlett
Ramon Bieri as Brown
John McLiam as Rev. Blauvelt
Don Keefer as Dean George Cooper
Norman Burton as Coach McCurdy
John Zaremba as President Tyler
 Ines Pedroza as Estella 
 Linda Meiklejohn as Student
 David Ladd as Student
 Jose Brad as Student
 Henry Brown as Student
 Frank Alesia as Student

Soundtrack
The soundtrack album for the movie was released in the USA and Canada in 1970 on Bell Records (BELL 1203).  The songs were written by Barry De Vorzon and Perry Botkin, Jr. except "We Don’t Know Where We’re Goin’", which they wrote with Melanie.
Melanie sang two tracks on the album: "We Don’t Know Where We’re Goin’" and "Stop! I Don’t Wanna Hear It Any More".

References

External links
 
 

1970 films
1970 drama films
American drama films
Columbia Pictures films
Films directed by Stanley Kramer
Films produced by Stanley Kramer
Films scored by Barry De Vorzon
Films scored by Perry Botkin Jr.
Films set in universities and colleges
1970s English-language films
1970s American films
English-language drama films